Arturo Checchi (1886 – 24 December 1971) was an Italian artist active in Tuscany. His paintings and sculptures are in an expressionist style.

Biography
He was born in Fucecchio. In 1898, he began the study of drawing with a private tutor. In 1902 he enrolled for three years at the Academy of Fine Arts in Florence, studying under Alfonso De Carolis. After completing studies, he settled in Florence, working as a decorative painter until the outbreak of the First World War led him to return to Fucecchio.

Checchi exhibited at the Florentine Promotrice of 1911, 1913, and 1914, and at  the Secessione Romana of 1914 and 1915. Works from the latter are now part of the collections of the Galleries of Modern Art at Florence and Rome.

In 1916 he had two personal shows in Forte dei Marmi and at the Kursaal in Viareggio. In 1918 he participated in the exhibition Ars Florentina, and in the 1920 and 1922 Promotrice of Florence. In 1920, he held an exhibition in Florence. 
In 1921 he presented three etchings at the Rome Biennale. In 1922 he exhibited at the "Quadrennial of Turin" and Fiorentina spring. In 1924 he was honored at the S. Ussi shows the framework for Le Marie. In 1925, he moved to Perugia to teach at the Academy of Fine Arts.

Arturo Checchi was present in 1927 at the exhibition of the Black and White of New York. He exhibited in the Venice Biennale for the first time in 1928, and again in 1932, 1934, 1936 and 1940 with etchings, drawings and paintings. In 1939, he taught figure drawing at the Academy of Brera and 1942 back to Academy of Florence as a lecturer until 1961. After the war he continued to exhibit in Rome and Florence.

Public works 
Since 1975, two sculptures are exhibited in Vallombrosa: The siren (1932) and Girls in the sun (1935). In the foyer of the Teatro Morley of  Perugia are displayed  "violin" and "guitar". His works are also in the Gallery of Modern Art in Turin and Milan, the Gallery of Modern Art in Prints and Drawings of the Uffizi and Rome, in national libraries in Florence and Paris, at the Ministry of Education and the Chamber of Commerce of Florence.

Awards and honors
 1927 Gold Medal at the International Graphic Palazzo Pitti in Florence.
 1970 he was awarded the gold medal by the International Centre for culture and the arts Montenero.

References

Bibliography  
 "The dishes broken by Arturo Checchi" by Piero Bargellini, New Editions Henry Vallecchi.
 "Arturo Checchi, the cards, the works and the life" by Federica De Paolis and Walter Scancarello, Bibliography and Information Publisher, Pontedera, 2013

External links 

1886 births
1971 deaths
People from Fucecchio
20th-century Italian painters
Italian male painters
Painters from Tuscany
Accademia di Belle Arti di Firenze alumni
Academic staff of Brera Academy
20th-century Italian male artists